Central Plateau may refer to:

Places
 Central Plateau (Brazil), in the Brazilian Highlands
 Central Plateau (Haiti)
 Central Plateau (Mexico)
 Central Plateau (New Zealand)
 Central Plateau (United States), a plateau in Yellowstone National Park, Wyoming
 Plateau State, Nigeria
 Central Siberian Plateau
 Central Plateau Conservation Area, an animal and plant conservation area in Tasmania, Australia
 Swiss Plateau

Other uses
 Central Plateau languages, a group of Plateau languages of Nigeria